Peter Scriven MBE (1930–1998) was the founding artistic director of the Marionette Theatre of Australia.

Background and legacy
Scriven played a huge role in establishing puppetry as a serious artform in Australia.
His Tintookies and Little Fella Bindi toured all over Australasia. The Tintookies, from an Aboriginal word meaning 'little people who come from the sandhills', was an elaborate marionette musical first staged by creator Peter Scriven at the Elizabethan Theatre in Sydney in 1956. After the success of this production, Tintookie became the generic name for any of the puppets used by the Marionette Theatre of Australia, formed by Scriven under the auspices of the Elizabethan Theatre Trust in 1965. The board was chaired by Sir Howard Beale, president of the Arts Council, and included Dr H.C. Coombs, Dorothy Helmrich and Scriven, who was also artistic director. Apart from commissioning and presenting original Australian puppet works, the Marionette Theatre of Australia was to establish a training school, encourage the development of other groups, and import overseas companies.

The Marionette Theatre of Australia produced innovative large-scale puppet shows with an overtly Australian content for children for more than 20 years, including the landmark productions LittleFella Bindi (1958) and Norman Lindsay's The Magic Pudding (1960). Bindi, the Aboriginal boy lead in LittleFella Bindi was manipulated by Scriven. He was supported by a team of five young puppeteers supervised by Igor Hyczka, a stage manager, a sound technician and a tour manager, Tony Gould (later to head the Queensland Performing Arts Centre). Later productions included The Explorers (telling the story of Australian explorers, Burke and Wills) and The Water Babies. A film version of The Explorers was produced in 1968 by Scriven for Film World Pty. Ltd.

Scriven was highly dedicated even as a boy to marionettes. According to his teacher, William Dalziel Nicol, Scriven was one of the first students examined in puppetry after a course conducted by the Education Department in 1943 in Victoria, Australia.

Scriven was a remarkable entrepreneur<ref>Tredinnick, D, Tintookie Man, the Last of His Tribe: A Story of Peter Scriven Puppetry, (Australasian Drama Studies – 1 October 2007</ref> and used his own funds to establish his marionette company. His legacy lives on through the marionettes from his Marionette Theatre of Australia, held in the archives of the National Institute of Dramatic Art in Sydney.

Honours
Scriven was awarded an MBE in the Queen's Birthday honours list in 1970 for services to Theatre.

Later years

After a spell in Singapore and Malaysia, Scriven returned to Sydney in 1973 as puppetry
consultant to the Australia Council for the Arts. In late 1974 Scriven put together a new version of The Tintookies. Utilising around 100 near life-size marionettes, this was the biggest puppet production ever undertaken in Australia. It premiered at the Princess Theatre in Melbourne on 8 January 1975 and toured Asia in early 1976.

Scriven's next home was Sri Lanka. He commissioned local puppeteers to make the marionettes for The Tintookie Man'', a small-scale show that he presented on an independent tour of Australian schools in 1976-7. When he left to live in the Philippines, the show was continued by Graeme Mathieson, an accomplished puppeteer with whom Scriven had worked at the MTA.

In 1974 Richard Bradshaw succeeded Scriven as artistic director of the Marionette Theatre of Australia. Scriven's work with marionettes was discontinued in favour of rod puppetry. The Marionette Theatre of Australia became an autonomous body in 1979 and from 1983 had its own theatre in the Rocks. It closed in 1988 due to losing federal government funding. Many of Scriven's marionettes were lost in a warehouse fire.

Scriven spent his last years living in increasingly reduced circumstances in Manila, finally subsisting on just $5 a day. He worked on a play and an autobiography, but neither has been published. In 1998, diagnosed with a brain tumour, Scriven returned to Australia. He had been here just three weeks when, on 13 October 1998, he was found dead in a boarding house in Fortitude Valley, Brisbane. The man whose artistry had entertained countless thousands of Australian youngsters and had inspired a new generation of professional puppeteers had just $1.50 in his pocket. He was survived by many of his Tintookie marionettes, which now live in the archives of the National Institute of Dramatic Art in Sydney, and his brother, philosopher and polymath Michael Scriven.

Scriven's enthusiasm and expertise had legitimised Australian puppetry, transforming it from a children's party distraction into a major performing art form that attracts wide audiences and government funding.

References

Books and articles

External links
Peter Scriven and the Sydney Powerhouse Museum collection
Peter Scriven Tintookies marionettes in the collection of the State Library of Victoria and the National Archives, Australia
Marionette Theatre of Australia Puppet Collection (Peter Scriven) – National Institute of Dramatic Arts Archive
Peter Scriven biography
Peter Scriven MBE 1930–1998

1930 births
1998 deaths
Australian puppeteers
Australian theatre directors
Australian Members of the Order of the British Empire
Theatre directors from Melbourne
Performing arts presenters
Australian designers